Fung Chi-wood (23 August 1956) was a member of the Legislative Council of Hong Kong, Regional Council, Shatin District Board Member, and a priest of the Anglican Church in Hong Kong.

He was famous for leading the movement against the Daya Bay Nuclear Plant in 1986 and continued to be active in the pro-democracy camp after the handover of Hong Kong.

References

1956 births
Members of the Regional Council of Hong Kong
District councillors of Sha Tin District
Living people
United Democrats of Hong Kong politicians
Democratic Party (Hong Kong) politicians
Social Democratic Forum politicians
The Frontier (Hong Kong) politicians
Hong Kong Association for Democracy and People's Livelihood politicians
Hong Kong Anglicans
HK LegCo Members 1991–1995
Hong Kong Christian clergy